Omorgus ponderosus is a species of hide beetle in the subfamily Omorginae and subgenus Afromorgus.

References

ponderosus
Beetles described in 1901